The Opel Insignia is a large family car (D-segment in Europe) developed and produced by the German car manufacturer Opel since 2008. Taking its name from a 2003 concept car, the model line serves as the flagship Opel car line, slotted above the Astra and Corsa in size. The Insignia serves as the successor for both the Signum and Vectra model lines, replacing both vehicles under a single nameplate. Currently in its second generation, the model line is offered in four-door sedan/saloon body styles, five-door liftback, and as a five-door station wagon/estate.

Sold worldwide, the Insignia is marketed under multiple nameplates. Under Opel tradition, the model line is marketed by Vauxhall in the United Kingdom, taking on the Vauxhall Insignia name. Both generations of the model line have been marketed in Latin America and North America as the Buick Regal (sales of the Regal continue in China). GM Australia marketed the second-generation Insignia as the Holden Commodore through 2020 (until discontinuing both the model line and the Holden brand).

The launch vehicle of the GM Epsilon II platform, Opel produces the Opel/Vauxhall Insignia in Adam Opel AG Werk Rüsselsheim in Rüsselsheim, Germany. SAIC-GM produces the Buick Regal in Shanghai, China (exclusively for the Chinese market).



History
In December 2006, Vauxhall stated they would retire the Vectra nameplate from the previous model. Then General Motors Europe president, Carl-Peter Forster, explained that the all new car would be "a radical departure" from the current model and that the "Vectra" name would be dropped to reflect this change. In late 2007, Vauxhall confirmed that the successor's name would be Insignia.

With the Insignia, Opel planned to regain some of the market share that the executive Omega once occupied during its production.

First generation (G09; 2008) 

The Insignia debuted as the Vauxhall Insignia at the 2008 British International Motor Show in London on 23 July. It then went on sale in European dealerships in October 2008 for the 2009 model year as a five-door liftback and five-door estate dubbed Sports Tourer – a departure for Opel which traditionally used the "Caravan" name to denote the estate bodystyle. It was the first production car to be based on the Epsilon II platform, which was also used on other models such as the 2010 Saab 9-5 and the Chevrolet Malibu.

Design wise, the Insignia offers  more knee room than the Vectra.

The Insignia was the first car to debut redesigned badges for both the Opel and Vauxhall brands. For Vauxhall, it was the first car to dispense with the characteristic "V" grille that has adorned Vauxhall models since 1994, which differentiated them from the otherwise identical Opel models.

The Insignia was also the first Opel to debut many new and improved safety features, including:

 (an improved) Adaptive Forward Lighting – bi-xenon, gas discharge headlamps with variable light beam distribution in width, direction and range. Advanced Front-Lighting System (AFS), static cornering light, complemented by daytime running lights with LEDs. Sensors and software monitor the surroundings, traffic and weather conditions so that the system can activate the appropriate lighting function.
 Opel Eye – This uses a camera at the top of the windscreen to monitor the area in front of the vehicle. Information from the camera is continuously analysed to identify road markings and traffic signs. Road markings are used as the basis of the first of Opel Eye's two functions: lane departure warning. Traffic signs are recognised and indicated to the driver in the second function: traffic sign memory.
At speeds above , Opel Eye warns the driver if the car is about to veer inadvertently out of the lane in which it is travelling. The system can detect road markings and, if they are sufficiently distinct, unmarked road edges. The Insignia was the first production car to feature a dual function frontal camera with traffic sign recognition.

Pre-facelift

Markets

OPC 
In early 2009, Opel revealed the Insignia OPC, a high performance variant of the Insignia. Like the preceding Vectra OPC, it is powered by a 2.8 litre turbocharged V6 (Manufactured in Melbourne, Australia).

Of this 435,  are available from 2,000 rpm. It is paired with a six speed manual transmission / six-speed automatic transmission and Saab's (Haldex) active all wheel drive system. The Insignia OPC has a modified MacPherson strut front suspension called HiPerStrut which reduces torque steer.

Also standard is an electronic limited slip differential for the rear wheels and Opel's FlexRide adaptive suspension, which has three settings (OPC, Sport, and Normal). An OPC version of the Insignia Sports Tourer wagon has also been unveiled and is currently on sale. In April 2011, Opel launched the Insignia OPC Unlimited, with no speed limiter.

Country Tourer 
The Opel Insignia Country Tourer made its world premiere at the Frankfurt Motor Show in September 2013 as a crossover-styled station wagon.

Facelift 
A major facelift was introduced in June 2013, with new exterior and interior styling, new engines, and new safety features. The car officially premiered at the September 2013 Frankfurt Motor Show, before going on sale later in 2013.

The new design includes a newly designed cockpit with a simplified control panel and two eight inch colour displays, a four way infotainment system via new a touchpad in the centre console, an eight-inch touchscreen, steering wheel controls, voice command, radar and camera based driver assistance and safety systems, such as full speed adaptive cruise control and imminent collision braking, rear camera, lane change assistance, blind spot alert, and rear cross traffic alert.

The second generation Insignia was revealed in December 2016, and was reported to be renamed Insignia Grand Sport.

Engines

2008–2013 
From launch, the Insignia was offered with four petrol engines:

1.6 L ; 1.8 L ; 2.0 L Turbo ; 2.8 L V6 with  –

and three diesel engines (all derived from the Fiat/GM JTD engine), all displacing 2.0 litres:

2.0 L ; 2.0 L ; 2.0 L .

In 2009, a 1.6 L Turbo petrol , the ecoFLEX diesels, and the OPC versions were introduced.

From September 2010, the 2.0 CDTi diesel engine gained Adaptive 4x4 as an option. Due to the sale of Saab, production was delayed until 2012. The BiTurbo CDTI was offered with front- or four-wheel drive. All engines have a six speed manual transmission as standard, with some engines having an automatic transmission as an option.

Since launch, all diesels have improved their emissions. In 2011, some engines gained Start/Stop, all diesel engines have this option, with more petrol engines expected to gain the technology in the future.

In 2009, a new range of ecoFLEX diesel engine offered same amount of power, but less CO2-emission (g/km) and fuel consumption. The  Bi turbo diesel engine has 129 CO2-emission (g/km).

2013–2017 
Alongside the facelift of 2013 came a new range of engines – some existing, some tweaked, and some brand new. Diesel engines available at launch include the 2.0 CDTI ecoFLEX (also with Start/Stop), with outputs of 120 PS, 140 PS, and 163 PS and the existing 195 PS BiTurbo. There is also a non ecoFLEX engine with 130 PS which is only available with automatic transmission.

Petrol engines include the existing 1.4 Turbo and 1.8 (only on some markets), and the all new 1.6 SIDI Turbo engine introduced in the Cascada, and new 2.0 SIDI Turbo.

All engines come with a six speed manual gearbox as standard, with a six speed automatic available as an option on the 1.6 and 2.0 SIDI turbo petrol engines, and the 2.0 CDTI 163 PS and 195 PS diesel engines. All petrol and diesel engines have a Start/Stop system except the 2.0 CDTI with 130 PS.

In September 2014, Opel introduced its all new generation of engines – large diesel engine, starting with 2.0 CDTI engine with 170 PS and 400 Nm, which is a part of new strategy in which Opel will introduce 17 new engines in a period from 2014 to 2018. The new engine became available from the end of 2014/beginning of 2015.

Awards 
Since making its début, the Opel Insignia has won more than fifty national and international awards, including 'Best Executive Car' in the United Kingdom and Slovenia, 'Best Family Car' in Ireland twice, and best car for fleet customers in the United Kingdom, Austria, Denmark, and Portugal.
 The Insignia was voted 2009 European Car of the Year.
 The Insignia scored a five star rating in EuroNCAP.
 In 2011, German institute DEKRA gave Opel an award for the Insignia as a car with the fewest flaws in its class.
 In 2012, Gesellschaft für Technische Überwachung mbH/Association for Technical Supervision evaluated Opel Insignia as number one in terms of used car quality.

Production and sales 
Production started at the end of 2008 on all major markets in Europe. At launch, the Vauxhall versions were produced in Exclusiv, S, SE, SRi, Elite, and VXR specification levels. It was a popular choice with British buyers, being the nation's ninth best selling car in 2009 – its first full year on sale, outselling its direct competitor the Ford Mondeo, but just falling short of the sales achieved by the more upmarket BMW 3 Series.

At the beginning several trim levels were available, depending on the market: Essentia, Edition, Sport, Cosmo, OPC. Later on others were added, such as the Business edition, Selection, Active, 150 years of Opel, and Innovation.

By August 2011, over 400,000 Insignias had been sold, and on 26 April 2012, the 500,000th Insignia was produced. The last vehicle rolled off the line in April 2017, in time for the release of the Insignia II.

Second generation (Z18; 2017) 

First leaked on public in December 2016, and finally Insignia had its public debut at the International Motor Fair in Belgrade in March 2017. The design took design cues from the 2013 Opel Monza Concept. From this point, the traditional four door notchback saloon version was officially removed. The vehicle was officially revealed on 26 June 2017.

The car is based on a moderately updated version of Epsilon II platform and was wholly developed by General Motors. After the sale of Opel to PSA Group and later Stellantis, it is continued to be produced under license.

Opel dropped the OPC designation for its performance Insignia, instead reverting to their older GSi nameplate, last seen on the third generation Opel Vectra. The GSi nameplate also replaces VXR, on the Vauxhall version of the Insignia. This version of the Insignia is badged as the Holden Commodore ZB in Australia and New Zealand, and as the sixth generation Buick Regal in the Americas and Asia.

After a 2020 facelift, only the 2-liter four-cylinder petrol engine remained available in Europe, while a new 1.5-liter three-cylinder and a 2.0-liter four cylinder diesel replaced the earlier 1.6 and 2.0. The new diesel engines share their dimensions with the new Duramax inline-six diesel engine, used in the Chevrolet Silverado and Suburban.

In 2022, Vauxhall discontinued the Insignia from their model range as the result of the brand would moving towards a fully electric lineup and the decline of the D-segment in Europe which also lead to the discontinuation of the Ford Mondeo and the saloon version of the Volkswagen Passat. 

Opel also ended production of the Opel Insignia in 2022. PSA later reverted course and said that the Insignia nameplate will be resurrected as a Crossover SUV in 2024 for both Opel and Vauxhall brands.

Under Stellantis' corporate umbrella, the DS 9 now covers the D/E segments in Europe.

GSi

Facelift (2020)

Engines

Holden Commodore (ZB) 

The Opel Insignia B was marketed in Australia and New Zealand as the Holden Commodore ZB; the fifth generation of the Commodore. This was Holden's first and only imported model to be sold under the Commodore nameplate. The range included the five door liftback and five door station wagon bodystyles.

Holden previously sold the first generation Insignia under the Opel brand (Opel Insignia) in 2012 and 2013, as well as under the Holden brand (Holden Insignia) from 2015 to 2017. It is the first Holden Commodore model to be manufactured outside of Australia, following the closure of Holden's Australian car manufacturing facilities at Elizabeth, South Australia and Fishermans Bend, Victoria on Friday 20 October 2017.

It is the first Commodore in thirty years to come with a four-cylinder engine as standard, and controversially, the first in its forty year production not to have a V8 powertrain option. GM made the decision to discontinue Australian manufacturing of the Holden Commodore due to falling sales and losses.

The ZB Commodore has proven to be unpopular in Australia resulting in cuts to the production schedule and the lowest unit sales per month on record since the original VB Commodore was released in 1978. November 2019 was the lowest month recorded with only 309 Commodores sold.

The ZB Commodore, and the Commodore nameplate, was discontinued at the end of 2020 due to low sales. Two months later, The Holden brand would be retired altogether by 2021.

Development 
Development for the ZB Commodore started in 2012, with Holden helping Opel design and develop the next generation Insignia, catering it to Australian conditions.

Once the car was ready, prototypes were sent to Australia for testing. Holden completed over 100,000 km of testing, with engineers bracing the cars to withstand local roads and make it feel similar to previous Commodore generations.

Safety 
Akin to its VF Commodore predecessor, the ZB achieved five stars in the ANCAP safety ratings. Originally, the ZB ANCAP rating was awarded based on the Euro NCAP test of a 1.6 litre model which is not sold in Australia. ANCAP conducted an audit test on specification of Australia V6 and confirmed its rating.

Powertrains 
The ZB Commodore is available with a range of engines including a four-cylinder petrol, four cylinder diesel and six-cylinder petrol engine. Front-wheel drive and all-wheel drive are available across the liftback and wagon body styles.

Models 
Compared to the VF Commodore, Holden rearranged the specification levels and model nameplates, with only the Calais (and Calais-V) surviving into the ZB series, this name having originated in the VK-series of 1984 as a luxury focused model. Various price cuts were made and wagon variants are more expensive.

Commodore LT

The LT is the new entry level Commodore, replacing the previous generation's Evoke model, which is also $3,935 cheaper than the predecessor's drive away price. It features a front wheel drive 2.0L Turbo four cylinder engine with a nine speed automatic, or an optional 2.0L diesel, with an eight speed automatic.

It comes with 17" alloy wheels, Autonomous Emergency Braking (AEB), Lane Keep Assist, a 7" MyLink system with Apple CarPlay & Android Auto and Passive Entry & Push Button Start as standard. The model is available as liftback or wagon.

Commodore RS
The RS is a visually sportier improvement over the LT model, with an upgraded interior featuring different seats and steering wheel. It also possesses more safety features, including Blind Zone Alert and Rear Cross Traffic Alert. The RS has two drivetrain choices, a front wheel drive 2.0L Turbo four cylinder engine with a nine speed Automatic, or an All Wheel Drive 3.6L V6 (available as an exclusive option with the liftback body style). It comes with 18" alloy wheels. The model is available as liftback or wagon.

Commodore RS–V
The RS–V is similar to the RS Model but includes more features such as an upgraded 8" MyLink system incorporating satellite navigation, wireless phone charging, Hi Per Strut Suspension and an Adaptive AWD system. Only the V6 AWD powertrain is offered in liftback and wagon forms.

Commodore VXR
The VXR is Holden's new flagship model following Holden's decision to rest the well known SS nameplate along with the V8 Engine configuration. The VXR nameplate was originally used for the British Vauxhall VXR. It features 20" alloy wheels, sportier lavishings and leather seats with a massage function. Safety features include a 360 degree camera and Continuous Damping Control Suspension. It is only available in liftback with the V6 powertrain.

Commodore Calais

Retaining the previous generation's familiar name, the Calais is the base premium model. Standard equipment includes 18" alloy wheels, leather seating with a heating function, wireless phone charging, Blind Spot Alert, Rear Cross Traffic Alert and an 8" MyLink system. Available as a Liftback or Tourer, the former receives the 2.0L petrol four cylinder engine, or an optional diesel engine, while the wagon is exclusively fitted with the V6 powertrain.

Commodore Calais–V

Carrying over the previous generation "V" flair, the Calais–V is the flagship premium model. Standard offerings include 20" alloy wheels, an Adaptive AWD system, a 360 degree camera, and massaging driver seat. It is available in either a liftback or wagon bodystyle, with the V6 powertrain being the only on offer.

Motorsport 

For marketing purposes, the ZB Commodore will be raced in various motorsport disciplines, however, the race cars generally have no physical or mechanical relationship with the production model, other than similar looks, as an exterior shell is built to resemble the road going cars, with a rear wheel drive tube frame chassis underneath.

Supercars Championship
The ZB Commodore is used by teams running Holdens in the Supercars Championship. Powered by the same V8 engine as used in the VF, a turbo charged V6 engine was under development for use in 2019, however the project was cancelled in April 2018 amid engineering concerns that the V6 would not be competitive.

Sales 
Sales of the new Commodore commenced in February 2018. The ZB is the first Commodore produced outside of Australia since the nameplate's induction in 1978, leading to much public backlash.

Consumer uptake and acceptance have been the lowest for any Commodore branded vehicle in the history of Holden manufacturing, however, this has also come at the same time as the nameplate has shifted market segment and competition, with the ZB outperforming all but the Toyota Camry in the Medium/Large segment, including the Mazda6 and Ford Mondeo.

Future developments 
When the decision was made to cease vehicle production in Australia and source the ZB Commodore from Europe, Opel and Vauxhall were still subsidiaries of GM. On 1 August 2017, both were sold to Groupe PSA, who would transfer the Opel Insignia platform to PSA platforms as early as 2021, which meant the current model would be discontinued as PSA planned to export PSA-based Opel models globally from 2018 onwards.

On 17 October 2018, Holden halted imports of the Commodore due to slow sales, and an increasing number of unsold cars at its dealerships. Holden discontinued the Commodore range of vehicles, shifting focus to SUV sales in 2020.

Motorsport 

The Thorney Motorsport team first ran a Vauxhall Insignia VXR in the last round of the 2011 British Touring Car Championship to prepare a two car team for the season of 2012.

Only one car was run in four rounds – 1 and 2 driven by John Thorne, and 6 and 9 driven by Tony Gilham. Tony's Team HARD bought the two Insignias from Thorney Motorsport, and raced one of them himself in the last round of the 2012 season.

Driving both cars for the season of 2013 were James Cole and Jack Goff, running under the RCIB Insurance Racing team name. RCIB Insurance Racing/Team Hard sold the cars to BMR for the 2014 BTCC season, and would be driven by Jack Goff and Warren Scott. The Insignia was not as competitive as hoped and the cars were replaced mid season with Volkswagen CCs.

Other rebranding 
In Chile, the Insignia was introduced in 2008 as the Chevrolet Vectra. In 2013, the model line dropped its Chevrolet name, adopting the Opel Insignia nameplate. 

In August 2012, the Opel Insignia was introduced to Australia; following the 2013 withdrawal of Opel from Australia by GM, the model line was dropped from the market. For 2015, the Insignia returned to Australia (and for the first time, New Zealand) under the Holden marque, slotted slightly under the Commodore range in market position.

2003 Insignia concept 

The Opel Insignia nameplate saw its first use on a 2003 concept car. For the 2003 Frankfurt Motor Show, Opel debuted a concept car previewing a potential mid-2000s full-size luxury car (F-segment) for the brand.

Derived from the rear-wheel drive GM V platform used by the VY Holden Commodore and Statesman, the Opel Insignia concept vehicle was styled as a fastback 5-door liftback. The engine was sourced from the Chevrolet Corvette C5, pairing a 344 hp LS1 V8 with an all-new 7-speed automatic transmission.

The Insignia debuted several notable features, including a reconfigurable rear seat (changing between 5-passenger seating and a 2+2 layout with a rear center console), LED headlamps (powered by 405 LEDs), a reconfigurable dashboard and center console (with air-conditioned storage and humidor). The rear sliding doors were fitted with pantographic hinges, allowing for the deletion of external guide rails.

Intended primarily as a debut of the design language of the Opel brand for the mid-2000s, the Insignia was not officially intended for production. In the beginning of 2005, Opel stated that it would not build a production version of the vehicle, claiming it would be too heavy and expensive. Elements of the Insignia concept design were eventually adopted by other GM vehicles, including the 2015 Buick Avenir concept (sharing a similar fastback/4-door coupe configuration) and the 2008-2017 Opel Insignia/Buick Regal (rear fascia) and the 2010-2016 Buick LaCrosse (roofline); its liftback configuration was adopted by the 2018 Insignia/Regal/Commodore.

Notes

References

External links 

Official international Opel Insignia website
Official Opel Insignia website (Ireland)

Insignia
Insignia
Front-wheel-drive vehicles
All-wheel-drive vehicles
Mid-size cars
Full-size vehicles
Luxury vehicles
ANCAP large family cars
Euro NCAP large family cars
Compact sport utility vehicles
Crossover sport utility vehicles
Sports sedans
Station wagons
Hatchbacks
Cars introduced in 2008
Touring cars
2010s cars
ZB